The 2023 All-Ireland Senior Football Championship Final is scheduled to be the 136th final of the All-Ireland Senior Football Championship and the culmination of the 2023 All-Ireland Senior Football Championship. The match is scheduled to be played at Croke Park in Dublin on 30 July 2023.

If the game is a draw after 70 minutes, 20 minutes of extra time is to be played. If the game is still level, the final will be replayed.

Match details

Notes

References

1
All-Ireland Senior Football Championship Finals
All-Ireland Senior Football
All-Ireland Senior Football Championship Final